net2ftp is a web based File Transfer Protocol (FTP) client, written in PHP.

Features
As well as offering standard FTP functions, net2ftp also offers a variety of features including archiving and extracting files and directories, and downloading a selected group of files and/or directories as an archive.

net2ftp can be set to restrict connections via an access list and can log user actions. Other plugins can be installed to add additional functionality as well. net2ftp can also be downloaded and installed on a host server, in which the requirements are:

A web server which can run PHP
PHP 4.2.3 or greater (one optional feature requires PHP 5)
At least 7.5 MB of free space for the net2ftp binaries
MySQL for daily limits and advanced logging

Integration
net2ftp has been integrated into many popular content management systems, including Drupal, Joomla, Mambo, and XOOPS. net2ftp has also been translated into over 15 languages.

References
net2ftp homepage
net2ftp Help for administrators
net2ftp.nl.eu.org is version 1.00
Used by the Invisionix Systems IRSR

Free FTP clients
Free software programmed in PHP